Tricolia delicata is a species of sea snail, a marine gastropod mollusk in the family Phasianellidae.

Description
The length of the shell attains 2.1 mm.

Distribution
This marine species occurs off the Philippines.

References

 Poppe G.T., Tagaro S.P. & Goto Y. (2018). New marine species from the Central Philippines. Visaya. 5(1): 91-135. page(s): 96, pl. 4 figs 1-3.

External links
 Worms Link

Phasianellidae